is a railway station on the Tokyu Setagaya Line in Setagaya-ku, Tokyo, Japan, operated by Tokyu Corporation.

Station layout
The station consists of two side platforms serving two tracks.

Platforms

History
The station opened on January 18, 1925.

References

Railway stations in Japan opened in 1925
Tokyu Setagaya Line
Stations of Tokyu Corporation
Railway stations in Tokyo